Erling Landsværk (born: 19 January 1962) is a sailor from Bærum, Norway, who represented his country at the 1992 Summer Olympics in Barcelona, Spain as crew member in the Soling. With helmsman Rune Jacobsen and fellow crew member Thom Haaland they took the 105th place.

References

Living people
1962 births
Norwegian male sailors (sport)
Sailors at the 1992 Summer Olympics – Soling
Olympic sailors of Norway
Sportspeople from Bærum